Derrick Lott (born June 18, 1990) is an American football defensive tackle who is currently a free agent. He played college football at Chattanooga.

Professional career

Tennessee Titans
Lott signed with the Tennessee Titans as an undrafted free agent on May 11, 2015. He was waived on August 30, 2015.

Tampa Bay Buccaneers
On September 16, 2015, Lott was signed to the Tampa Bay Buccaneers' practice squad. He spent time on and off the Buccaneers' practice squad throughout the 2015 season before signing a reserve/future contract with the team on January 5, 2016. On April 29, 2016, Lott was waived by the Buccaneers.

Philadelphia Eagles
On May 24, 2016, Lott was signed by the Philadelphia Eagles. On July 14, 2016, the Eagles waived Lott.

Oakland Raiders
On July 29, 2016, Lott was signed by the Oakland Raiders. On September 3, 2016, Lott was released by the Raiders as part of final roster cuts.

Saskatchewan Roughriders
In January 2017, Lott was signed to the Saskatchewan Roughriders of the Canadian Football League. After participating in a mini-camp held in April, Lott was subsequently released on May 1, 2017.

Detroit Lions
On August 27, 2017, Lott was signed by the Detroit Lions. He was waived by the Lions on September 2, 2017 and was signed to the practice squad the next day, only to be released the following day.

References

External links
Tampa Bay Buccaneers bio

1990 births
Living people
People from Kennesaw, Georgia
Sportspeople from Cobb County, Georgia
Players of American football from Georgia (U.S. state)
American football defensive tackles
Georgia Bulldogs football players
Chattanooga Mocs football players
Tampa Bay Buccaneers players
Philadelphia Eagles players
Detroit Lions players
American players of Canadian football
Canadian football defensive linemen
Saskatchewan Roughriders players